Qin Wuyang (秦舞陽) was a young man who followed Jing Ke when the latter went on the mission to assassinate Ying Zheng, the king of Qin. Both Jing and Qin were first disguised as envoys from Yan and were there to present the severed head of "Fan Wuqi", a Qin turncoat, and a map of Dukang. However, Qin Wuyang started sweating profusely and shivered due to nervousness and this aroused Ying Zheng's suspicion when he saw the young man. Thus, Qin Wuyang was not allowed to go near the king and present the head and map. Only Jing Ke went near but Jing Ke missed and failed to assassinate Ying Zheng. Both Jing Ke and Qin Wuyang were killed after this assassination attempt.

Family
Qin Kai (general), grandfather of Qin Wu Yang, general of Yan (state)

227 BC deaths
Failed regicides
Zhou dynasty people
Year of birth unknown
3rd-century BC Chinese people
Chinese assassins
Yan (state)